Gastrophysa is a genus of beetles in the family Chrysomelidae, in which the females typically exhibit swollen, membranous abdomens, a condition known as physogastrism.

Species
These nine species belong to the genus Gastrophysa:
 Gastrophysa analis (Reitter, 1890) g
 Gastrophysa atrocyanea Motschulsky g
 Gastrophysa cyanea F. E. Melsheimer, 1847 i c g b (green dock beetle)
 Gastrophysa dissimilis (Say, 1824) i c g b
 Gastrophysa formosa (Say, 1824) i c g b
 Gastrophysa janthina Suffrian, 1851 g
 Gastrophysa polygoni (Linnaeus, 1758) i c g b (knotweed leaf beetle)
 Gastrophysa unicolor (Marsham, 1802) g
 Gastrophysa viridula (De Geer, 1775) g
Data sources: i = ITIS, c = Catalogue of Life, g = GBIF, b = Bugguide.net

References

External links

Chrysomelinae
Chrysomelidae genera
Taxa named by Louis Alexandre Auguste Chevrolat